Litavis (Gaulish: Litauī 'Earth', lit. 'the Broad One') is a Gallic deity whose cult is primarily attested in east-central Gaul during the Roman period. She was probably originally an earth-goddess. In medieval Celtic languages, various terms derived from *Litauia came to designate the Brittany Peninsula.

Epigraphic evidence

Her name is found in inscriptions found at Aignay-le-Duc and Mâlain of the Côte-d'Or, France, where she is invoked along with the Gallo-Roman god Mars Cicolluis in a context which suggests that she might have been his consort. Also, a Latin dedicatory inscription from Narbonne (which was in the far south of Gaul), France, bears the words "MARTI CICOLLUI ET LITAVI" ("To Mars Cicolluos and Litavis").

Name

Etymology 
The Gaulish divine name  ('Earth', lit. 'the Vast One') likely stems from Proto-Celtic  ('broad'; cf. Old Breton , Middle Welsh , 'broad'), ultimately from Proto-Indo-European  ('the Broad One'; cf. Sanskrit , Greek ; also Old Norse , 'earth').

The Gaulish personal name Litauicos ('sovereign', lit. 'possessor of the land') is also cognate with the Welsh , meaning 'pertaining to Brittany', pointing to a Proto-Celtic term *Litauī-kos, here attached to the determinative suffix -kos.

Medieval terms 
The medieval or 'neo-Celtic' names for the Brittany Peninsula (cf. Old Irish , Old Welsh , Old Breton , Latinized as ) all stem from an original *Litauia, meaning 'Land' or 'Country'. In the Irish  (11th c.),  means 'Britons of the Continent or Armorica, i.e. Bretons.' Linguist Rudolf Thurneysen proposed a semantic development from an Ancient Celtic term meaning 'broad land, continent' into the Insular Celtic names for the part of the Continent nearest the British Islands.

References

Bibliography

Further reading 

 "Litavia" — article in Jones' Celtic Encyclopedia by Mary Jones
 "Litavis" — Litavis in the will of Lingon (in French); automatic Google translation into English
 Etymological translations of "Litanus," "Litaui/Litavi," "Litauis/Litavis," etc. by Patrick Cuadrado (in French); automatic Google translation into English

Celtic goddesses
Earth goddesses
Gallo-Roman religion
Tutelary deities
Gaulish goddesses
History of Brittany